The Musha Church Massacre refers to the killing of more than a thousand Tutsi civilians in April 1994 by Interahamwe, a Hutu paramilitary organization.

Chronology

According to the ICTR verdict in Paul Bisengimana case between the 8 and 13 April 1994, more than a thousand Tutsi civilians sought refuge at Musha Church, situated in Rutoma sector, Gikoro commune, Kigali-Rural préfecture, having fled from attacks against Tutsi civilians occurring throughout the préfecture. On about April 12, 1994, weapons such as guns and grenades were distributed to Interahamwe militiamen and other armed civilians at Musha Church by members of the Rwandan Army. On about 13 April 1994, an attack was launched against the Tutsi civilians seeking refuge at Musha Church. The attackers used guns, grenades, machetes, pangas and other traditional weapons. This attack resulted in the killing of more than a thousand Tutsi civilians. During the attack, a civilian militiaman named Manda set fire to the Church, causing the death of many refugees.

References
http://unictr.unmict.org/sites/unictr.org/files/case-documents/ictr-00-60/trial-judgements/en/060413.pdf

External links
ICTR - Cases

1994 in Christianity
Rwandan genocide
Massacres in Rwanda
Mass murder in 1994
Massacres in 1994
Attacks on churches in Africa